Joan Butler (née Beauchamp), Countess of Ormond (1396 – 3 or 5 August 1430) was the first wife of James Butler, 4th Earl of Ormond, and the mother of his five children. Their principal residence was Kilkenny Castle in Ireland.

Life

Joan de Beauchamp was the daughter of William de Beauchamp, 1st Baron Bergavenny and his first wife, Lady Joan FitzAlan. She had a brother and sister:

Richard de Beauchamp, 1st Earl of Worcester, 2nd Baron Bergavenny (c.1397 – 18 March 1422), who married Lady Isabel le Despenser (27 July 1400 – 26 or 27 December 1439), by whom he had one daughter, Elizabeth de Beauchamp, Baroness Bergavenny.
Elizabeth de Beauchamp.

Joan's paternal grandparents were Thomas de Beauchamp, 11th Earl of Warwick and Lady Katherine Mortimer, and her maternal grandparents were Richard FitzAlan, 11th Earl of Arundel and Elizabeth de Bohun.

Joan de Beauchamp died 3 or 5 August 1430, and was buried in the Mercers' Chapel, St Thomas of Acre, London.

Marriage and issue
She married, before 28 August 1413, James Butler, 4th Earl of Ormond, by whom she had three sons and two daughters:

James Butler, 5th Earl of Ormond, who died without legitimate issue.
John Butler, 6th Earl of Ormond, who died without legitimate issue.
Thomas Butler, 7th Earl of Ormond, whose daughter Margaret was a grandmother of Anne Boleyn.
Elizabeth Butler, who married John Talbot, 2nd Earl of Shrewsbury and had issue.
Anne Butler, who died unmarried.

Ancestry

Notes

References
 

1396 births
1430 deaths
Daughters of barons
Irish countesses
Normans in Ireland
Anglo-Norman women
14th-century Irish people
14th-century Irish women
15th-century Irish people
15th-century Irish women